Michel Klein (born 1958) is a French fashion designer.

In 2005, Itokin was the Michel Klein ready-to-wear license holder in Japan with retail value of €70 million.

References

French fashion designers
Living people
1958 births
Date of birth missing (living people)